The 22nd Annual Screen Actors Guild Awards, honoring the best achievements in film and television performances for the year 2015, were presented on January 30, 2016 at the Shrine Auditorium in Los Angeles, California. The ceremony was broadcast on both TNT and TBS 8:00 p.m. EST / 5:00 p.m. PST and the nominees were announced on December 9, 2015.

Carol Burnett was announced as the 2015 SAG Life Achievement Award honoree on July 20, 2015.

It was announced on the live Red Carpet Show that Mad Max: Fury Road had received the Screen Actors Guild Award for Outstanding Performance by a Stunt Ensemble in a Motion Picture and that Game of Thrones had received the Outstanding Performance by a Stunt Ensemble in a Television Series.

Winners and nominees
Winners are listed first and highlighted in boldface.

Film

Television

Screen Actors Guild Life Achievement Award
 Carol Burnett

In Memoriam 
Susan Sarandon introduced the "In Memoriam" segment, honoring the life and career of the actors who died in 2015:

Omar Sharif
Anita Ekberg
Theodore Bikel
Betsy Palmer
Taylor Negron
Anne Meara
Rod Taylor
Dean Jones
Wayne Rogers
Pat Harrington Jr.
Marge Royce
Martin Milner
Donna Douglas
Stan Freberg
Windell Middlebrooks
George Coe
John Connell
Christopher Lee
Lizabeth Scott
Dickie Moore
Roger Rees
Louis Jourdan
Gary Owens
Dick Van Patten
Geoffrey Lewis
Richard Dysart
David Bowie
Paul Napier
Elizabeth Wilson
Jack Larson
Natalie Cole
Judy Carne
Robert Loggia
Jayne Meadows
Alex Rocco
Al Molinaro
Patrick Macnee
Fred Dalton Thompson
David Canary
Marjorie Lord
Maureen O'Hara
Alan Rickman
Leonard Nimoy

References

External links

2015
Screen
Screen
Screen
Screen Actors Guild
Screen
January 2016 events in the United States